Carlos de Paula Couto, (Porto Alegre, August 30, 1910 – November 15, 1982) was a Brazilian paleontologist.

Biography
Paula Couto was a researcher at the National Museum of Brazil in Rio de Janeiro, specialized in paleontology of mammals. Over 40 years, published dozens of scientific articles in top international publications.

He was also responsible for rescuing the work of the Danish palaeontologist Peter Wilhelm Lund (1801–1880), who translated under the title Memórias sobre a Paleontologia Brasileira (Memoirs of the Brazilian Paleontology) (1850).

Among his works stand out, Brazilian Paleontology (Mammals) (1953) and Treaty of Paleomastozoologia (1979).

Awards
Awarded Fellowships from the John Simon Guggenheim Memorial Foundation in the Earth Science field of study in 1949, 1951 and 1966.

Notes

References 
 Book Os Fascinantes Caminhos da Paleontologia. Author : Antônio Isaia. Publisher Pallotti. (Portuguese)
 Book: "Cronologia Histórica de Santa Maria e do extinto município de São Martinho." 1787–1933. Vol I. Author: Romeu Beltrão, Publisher Pallotti, 1958. (Portuguese)

Brazilian paleontologists
People from Porto Alegre
1910 births
1982 deaths